Rascalimu (born Carlos Alidu Mumuni) is a Ghanaian-born American reggae musician.

See also 
 Sheriff Ghale

References

Living people
Ghanaian reggae musicians
Dagomba people
American reggae musicians
Dagbani-language singers
Year of birth missing (living people)